Oberea uninotaticollis is a species of beetle in the family Cerambycidae. It was described by Maurice Pic in 1939.

References

Beetles described in 1939
uninotaticollis